Lipase member H is an enzyme that in humans is encoded by the LIPH gene.

This gene encodes a membrane-bound member of the mammalian triglyceride lipase family. It catalyzes the production of 2-acyl lysophosphatidic acid (LPA), which is a lipid mediator with diverse biological properties that include platelet aggregation, smooth muscle contraction, and stimulation of cell proliferation and motility.

References

Further reading